This is a list of genera in the fungal division Ascomycota with uncertain taxonomic placement (incertae sedis). These genera have not yet been assigned to any class, order, or family. The compendium is based on the 2021 work "Outline of Fungi and fungus-like taxa", which lists 1148 Ascomycota genera incertae sedis.

A

Abropelta  – 1 sp.
Acarellina  – 1 sp.
Acaroconium  – 1 sp.
Acarocybe  – 3 spp.
Acarocybella  – 1 sp.
Acarocybellina  – 1 sp.
Acarocybiopsis  – 1 sp.
Acaropeltis  – 1 sp.
Achoropeltis  – 1 sp.
Acleistia  – 1 sp.
Acontium  – 4 spp.
Acrodictyella  – 1 sp.
Acrodictyopsis  – 1 sp.
Acrodontiella  – 1 sp.
Acrophragmis  – 4 spp.
Acrospeira  – 1 sp.
Acrostaurus  – 1 sp.
Actinocladium  – 6 spp.
Actinotexis  – 1 sp.
Actinothecium  – 5 spp.
Actinothyrium  – 10 spp.
Acumispora  – 5 spp.
Agaricodochium  – 1 sp.
Agarwalomyces  – 1 sp.
Agrabeeja  – 1 sp.
Agyriella  – 2 spp.
Agyriellopsis  – 3 spp.
Ahmadia  – 1 sp.
Ajrekarella  – 1 sp.
Alatosessilispora  – 1 sp.
Alciphila  – 1 sp.
Algonquinia  – 1 sp.
Alina  – 1 sp.
Allescheria  – 1 sp.
Allophoron  – 1 sp.
Allothyriella  – 3 spp.
Allothyrina  – 1 sp.
Allothyriopsis  – 1 sp.
Alpakesa  – 4 spp.
Alpakesiopsis  – 1 sp.
Alveariospora  – 1 sp.
Alveophoma  – 1 sp.
Alysidiopsis  – 5 spp.
Amallospora  – 1 sp.
Amblyosporium  – 4 spp.
Ameroconium  – 1 sp.
Amerodiscosiella  – 1 sp.
Amerodiscosiellina  – 1 sp.
Amerosporiopsis  – 2 spp.
Amerosympodula  – 1 sp.
Amoenodochium  – 1 sp.
Amoenomyces  – 1 sp.
Amphichaetella  – 1 sp.
Amphophialis  – 1 sp.
Amphoropycnium  – 1 sp.
Ampullicephala  – 1 sp.
Ampulliferina  – 2 spp.
Amylogalla  – 1 sp.
Anabahusakala  – 1 sp.
Anacraspedodidymum  – 2 spp.
Anaexserticlava  – 1 sp.
Anaphysmene  – 2 spp.
Anarhyma  – 1 sp.
Anaselenosporella  – 2 spp.
Anaseptoidium  – 1 sp.
Anasporidesmiella  – 2 spp.*
Anaverticicladus  – 1 sp.
Ancoraspora  – 1 sp.
Ancorasporella  – 1 sp.
Angiopomopsis  – 1 sp.
Angulimaya  – 1 sp.
Angulospora  – 1 sp.
Annellodentimyces  – 1 sp.
Annellodochium  – 1 sp.
Annellophorella  – 5 spp.
Annellospermosporella  – 1 sp.
Antennatula  – 10 spp.
Anthracoderma  – 3 spp.
Antimanoa  – 1 sp.
Antromyces  – 4 spp.
Anulohypha  – 1 sp.
Anungitopsis  – 7 spp.
Aoria  – 1 sp.
Aphanofalx  – 2 spp.
Apiocarpella  – 8 spp.
Apiotypa  – 1 sp.
Apogloeum  – 1 sp.
Apomelasmia  – 8 spp.
Aporellula  – 2 spp.
Aposporella  – 1 sp.
Apostrasseria  – 2 spp.
Arachnophora  – 11 sp.
Arachnospora  – 1 sp.
Arborillus  – 1 sp.
Arborispora  – 4 spp.
Arcuadendron  – 2 spp.
Ardhachandra  – 3 spp.
Argentinomyces  – 1 sp.
Argopericonia  – 2 spp.
Aristastoma  – 1 sp.
Arthrobotryum  – 5 spp.
Arthromoniliphora  – 1 sp.
Arthrosporium  – 2 spp.
Arthrowallemia  – 2 spp.
Articulophora  – 1 sp.
Artocarpomyces  – 1 sp.*
Ascochytopsis  – 5 spp.
Ascochytulina  – 3 spp.
Ascofascicula  – 6 spp.
Ascomauritiana  – 1 sp.
Ascosubramania  – 1 sp.
Ashtaangam  – 1 sp.
Aspilaima  – 1 sp.
Astelechia  – 2 spp.
Asterinothyriella  – 3 spp.
Asterinothyrium  – 1 sp.
Asteroconium  – 2 spp.
Asteromyces  – 1 sp.
Asterophoma  – 1 sp.
Asteroscutula  – 1 sp.
Asterostomopora  – 1 sp.
Asterostomopsis  – 1 sp.
Asterostomula  – 4 spp.
Asterostomulina  – 1 sp.
Astomella  – 1 sp.
Astronatelia  – 1 sp.
Atractilina  – 2 spp.
Atractobolus  – 1 sp.
Atrosetaphiale  – 1 sp.
Atrosynnema  – 1 sp.
Aurosphaeria  – 1 sp.
Avesicladiella  – 2 spp.
Avettaea  – 3 spp.

Top of page

B

 Bacillopeltis   – 1 sp.
 Bactridium  – 15 spp.
 Bactrodesmiella  – 2 spp.
 Baculospora  – 1 sp.
 Badarisama  – 1 sp.
 Bahuchashaka  – 1 sp.
 Bahugada  – 2 spp.
 Bahukalasa  – 1 sp.
 Balaniopsis  – 4 spp.
 Balanium  – 1 sp.
 Barbarosporina  – 1 sp.
 Barnettella  – 1 sp.
 Basauxia  – 1 sp.
 Batistina  – 1 sp.
 Batistospora  – 1 sp.
 Beauveriphora  – 1 sp.
 Beccopycnidium  – 1 sp.
 Beejadwaya  – 1 sp.
 Belemnospora  – 7 spp.
 Bellulicauda  – 2 spp.
 Beltramono  – 1 sp.
 Beltraniomyces  – 1 sp.
 Beniowskia  – 4 spp.
 Benjpalia  – 1 sp.
 Berggrenia  – 2 spp.
 Bhadradriella  – 1 sp.
 Bhadradriomyces  – 1 sp.
 Bharatheeya  – 3 spp.
 Bhatia  – 2 spp.
 Bibanasiella  – 1 sp.
 Bicoloromyces  – 1 sp.
 Biflagellospora  – 1 sp.
 Biflagellosporella  – 1 sp.
 Biflua  – 1 sp.
 Bimeris  – 1 sp.
 Bioconiosporium  – 2 spp.
 Biophomopsis  – 3 spp.
 Bisbyopeltis  – 1 sp.
 Bispora  – 31 spp.
 Bisseomyces  – 1 sp.
 Blastocatena  – 2 spp.
 Blastodictys  – 1 sp.
 Blastofusarioides  – 1 sp.
 Blastophorella  – 1 sp.
 Blastophragma  – 4 spp.
 Blastophragmia  – 1 sp.*
 Blennoria  – 4 spp.
 Blennoriopsis  – 1 sp.
 Bleptosporium  – 4 spp.
 Blodgettia  – 2 spp.
 Bostrichonema  – 4 spp.
 Botryoderma  – 4 spp.
 Botryodiplodina  – 1 sp.
 Botryomonilia  – 1 sp.
 Botryostroma  – 2 spp.
 Brachycephala  – 1 sp.
 Brachydesmiella  – 8 spp.
 Brachysporiellina  – 2 spp.
 Brachysporiopsis  – 1 sp.
 Braunomyces  – 1 sp.
 Brefeldiopycnis  – 1 sp.
 Brencklea  – 1 sp.
 Brevicatenospora  – 1 sp.
 Briosia  – 6 spp.
 Brycekendrickia  – 1 sp.
 Brykendrickia  – 1 sp.*
 Bryophytomyces  – 1 sp.
 Bulbilopycnis  – 1 sp.
 Bulbocatenospora  – 1 sp.
 Bullaserpens  – 1 sp.

Top of page

C

 Cacumisporium  – 9 spp.
 Caeruleoconidia  – 2 spp.
 Calcarispora  – 1 sp.
 Calceispora  – 2 spp.
 Callistospora  – 1 sp.
 Calocline  – 1 sp.
 Calongeomyces  – 1 sp.
 Camaroglobulus  – 1 sp.
 Camaropycnis  – 1 sp.
 Camarosporellum  – 1 sp.
 Camarosporiopsis  – 1 sp.
 Camposporidium  – 3 spp.
 Candelabrum  – 7 spp.
 Candelosynnema  – 1 sp.
 Capitorostrum  – 1 sp.
 Capnocheirides  – 1 sp.
 Capnofrasera  – 1 sp.
 Capsicumyces  – 1 sp.
 Carnegieispora  – 1 sp.
 Carnia  – 1 sp.
 Carrismyces  – 1 sp.
 Casaresia  – 1 sp.
 Castanedaea  – 1 sp.
 Catenocuneiphora  – 1 sp.
 Catenophora  – 3 spp.
 Catenophoropsis  – 1 sp.
 Catenosubulispora  – 1 sp.
 Catenosynnema  – 1 sp.
 Catenulaster  – 1 sp.
 Catinopeltis  – 1 sp.
 Cecidiomyces  – 1 sp.
 Ceeveesubramaniomyces  – 1 sp.
 Ceratocladium  – 2 spp.
 Ceratophorum  – 2 spp.
 Ceratopycnis  – 2 spp.
 Ceratosporella  – 19 spp.
 Ceratosporium  – 11 spp.
 Ceuthodiplospora  – 1 sp.
 Ceuthosira  – 1 sp.
 Ceuthosporella  – 1 sp.
 Chaetendophragmia  – 7 spp.
 Chaetoblastophorum  – 1 sp.
 Chaetochalara  – 7 spp.
 Chaetocytostroma  – 1 sp.
 Chaetodiplis  – 1 sp.
 Chaetodiplodina  – 2 spp.
 Chaetopeltaster  – 1 sp.
 Chaetophiophoma  – 1 sp.
 Chaetoplaca  – 1 sp.
 Chaetopsis  – 7 spp.
 Chaetopyrena  – 2 spp.
 Chaetoseptoria  – 1 sp.
 Chalarodendron  – 1 sp.
 Chalarodes  – 2 spp.
 Chantransiopsis  – 3 spp.
 Characonidia  – 1 sp.
 Charomyces  – 2 spp.
 Chasakopama  – 1 sp.
 Cheilaria  – 1 sp.
 Cheiroidea  – 1 sp.
 Cheiromycella  – 3 spp.
 Cheiromyceopsis  – 1 sp.
 Cheiromyces  – 6 spp.
 Cheiropolyschema  – 2 spp.
 Chiastospora  – 1 sp.
 Chithramia  – 1 sp.
 Chlamydopsis  – 1 sp.
 Choanatiara  – 2 spp.
 Choreospora  – 1 sp.
 Chrysachne  – 2 spp.
 Chrysalidopsis  – 1 sp.
 Chryseidea  – 1 sp.
 Ciferria  – 1 sp.
 Ciferrina  – 1 sp.
 Ciferriopeltis  – 1 sp.
 Ciferrioxyphium  – 2 spp.
 Ciliochora  – 2 spp.
 Ciliophora  – 2 spp.
 Ciliophorella  – 2 spp.
 Ciliosporella  – 2 spp.
 Circinoconiopsis  – 1 sp.
 Circinoconis  – 1 sp.
 Cissococcomyces  – 1 sp.
 Civisubramaniania  – 2 spp.
 Cladoconidium  – 1 sp.
 Cladoniicola  – 2 spp.
 Cladosphaera  – 1 sp.
 Cladosporiopsis  – 1 sp.
 Clasteropycnis  – 1 sp.
 Clathroconium  – 2 spp.
 Clauzadeomyces  – 1 sp.
 Clavariana  – 1 sp.
 Cleistocystis  – 1 sp.
 Cleistonium  – 1 sp.
 Cleistophoma  – 2 spp.
 Clypeochorella  – 1 sp.
 Clypeolum  – 8 spp.
 Clypeopatella  – 1 sp.
 Clypeophialophora  – 1 sp.
 Clypeopycnis  – 3 spp.
 Clypeoseptoria  – 3 spp.
 Clypeostagonospora  – 1 sp.
 Coccogloeum  – 1 sp.
 Codonmyces  – 1 sp.
 Colemaniella  – 1 sp.
 Coleodictyospora  – 2 spp.
 Coleoseptoria  – 1 sp.
 Colispora  – 3 spp.
 Colletoconis  – 1 sp.
 Colletosporium  – 1 sp.
 Collostroma  – 1 sp.
 Columnodomus  – 1 sp.
 Columnothyrium  – 1 sp.
 Comatospora  – 1 sp.
 Comocephalum  – 1 sp.
 Complexipes  – 2 spp.
 Condylospora  – 4 spp.
 Coniambigua  – 1 sp.
 Conioscyphopsis  – 1 sp.
 Coniothyrina  – 1 sp.
 Conjunctospora  – 1 sp.
 Conostoma  – 2 spp.
 Conostroma  – 3 spp.
 Consetiella  – 1 sp.
 Copromyces  – 1 sp.*
 Coremiella  – 1 sp.
 Cornucopiella  – 2 spp.
 Cornutostilbe  – 1 sp.
 Coronospora  – 4 spp.
 Corynecercospora  – 1 sp.
 Coryneliella  – 1 sp.
 Corynesporella  – 11 spp.
 Corynesporina  – 1 sp.
 Corynesporopsis  – 16 spp.
 Costanetoa  – 1 sp.
 Crandallia  – 4 spp.
 Craneomyces  – 1 sp.
 Craspedodidimella  – 1 sp.
 Creodiplodina  – 1 sp.
 Creonecte  – 1 sp.
 Creoseptoria  – 1 sp.
 Creothyriella  – 1 sp.
 Cribropeltis  – 1 sp.
 Crinigera  – 1 sp.
 Crousobrauniella  – 1 sp.
 Crustodiplodina  – 1 sp.
 Cryptoceuthospora  – 2 spp.
 Cryptocoryneopsis  – 1 sp.
 Cryptosporium  – 25 spp.
 Cryptumbellata  – 1 sp.
 Ctenosporium  – 1 sp.
 Cubasina  – 2 spp.
 Culicidospora  – 2 spp.
 Culicinomyces  – 3 spp.
 Curucispora  – 3 spp.
 Curvulariopsis  – 1 sp.
 Cyanopatella  – 1 sp.
 Cyanopyrenia  – 1 sp.
 Cyclomarsonina  – 1 sp.
 Cylindrogloeum  – 1 sp.
 Cylindromyces  – 1 sp.*
 Cylindrothyrium  – 1 sp.
 Cylindroxyphium  – 1 sp.
 Cyrtidium  – 1 sp.
 Cyrtidula  – ca. 5 spp.
 Cyrtopsis  – 1 sp.
 Cystodium  – 1 sp.
 Cystotricha  – 1 sp.
 Cytodiscula  – 1 sp.
 Cytogloeum  – 1 sp.
 Cytonaema  – 2 spp.
 Cytoplacosphaeria  – 2 spp.
 Cytosphaera  – 2 spp.
 Cytosporella  – 32 spp.
 Cyttariella  – 1 sp.

Top of page

D

 Dactylifera  – 1 sp.
 Dactylosporium  – 2 spp.
 Dasysticta  – 2 spp.
 Davisiella  – 2 spp.
 Deichmannia  – 1 sp.
 Delortia  – 3 spp.
 Dendrodomus  – 1 sp.
 Dendrographiella  – 1 sp.
 Dendrographium  – 8 spp.
 Dendrospora  – 10 spp.
 Dendrosporium  – 2 spp.
 Dendryphiosphaera  – 4 spp.
 Dennisographium  – 2 spp.
 Dentocircinomyces  – 1 sp.
 Descalsia  – 1 sp.
 Desertella  – 2 spp.
 Desmidiospora  – 3 spp.
 Dexhowardia  – 1 sp.
 Diaboliumbilicus  – 1 sp.
 Diademospora  – 1 sp.
 Diarimella  – 3 spp.
 Dichelostroma  – 1 sp.
 Dicholobodigitus  – 1 sp.
 Dichotomophthoropsis  – 2 spp.
 Dichotophora  – 2 spp.
 Dictyoceratosporella  – 3 spp.
 Dictyophrynella  – 1 sp.
 Dictyopolyschema  – 1 sp.
 Dictyorostrella  – 1 sp.
 Dictyospiropes  – 1 sp.
 Dictyotrichocladium  – 1 sp.
 Didymochaetina  – 1 sp.
 Didymopsis  – 5 spp.
 Didymosporina  – 1 sp.
 Diedickea  – 3 spp.
 Digicatenosporium  – 1 sp.
 Digitodochium  – 1 sp.
 Digitopodium  – 1 sp.
 Digitoramispora  – 4 spp.
 Dimastigosporium  – 2 spp.
 Diplocladiella  – 8 spp.
 Diplodinis  – 1 sp.
 Diplodinula  – 1 sp.
 Diploplenodomus  – 2 spp.
 Diplosporonema  – 1 sp.
 Diplozythiella  – 1 sp.
 Dipyrgis  – 1 sp.
 Discogloeum  – 1 sp.
 Discomycetoidea  – 1 sp.
 Discosiellina  – 1 sp.
 Discosporina  – 1 sp.
 Discotheciella  – 1 sp.
 Discozythia  – 1 sp.
 Dissitimurus  – 1 sp.
 Distobactrodesmium  – 1 sp.*
 Distophragmia  – 1 sp.
 Ditangifibula  – 1 sp.
 Domingoella  – 4 spp.
 Dothideodiplodia  – 1 sp.
 Dothioropsis  – 1 sp.
 Drepanospora  – 1 sp.
 Drudeola  – 1 sp.
 Drumopama  – 1 sp.
 Dryosphaera  – 3 spp.
 Dualomyces  – 2 spp.
 Dwayabeeja  – 3 spp.
 Dwayaloma  – 1 sp.
 Dwayalomella  – 1 sp.
 Dwibahubeeja  – 1 sp.
 Dwibeeja  – 1 sp.
 Dwiroopella  – 1 sp.

Top of page

E

 Ebollia  – 1 sp.
 Echinocatena  – 1 sp.
 Echinochondrium  – 1 sp.
 Echinoconidiophorum  – 1 sp.
 Effetia  – 1 sp.*
 Eiona  – 1 sp.
 Elachopeltella  – 2 spp.
 Elattopycnis  – 1 sp.
 Elegantimyces  – 1
 Ellisembiopsis  – 2 spp.
 Ellismarsporium  – 7 spp.
 Elotespora  – 1 sp.
 Embryonispora  – 1 sp.
 Enantioptera  – 2 spp.
 Endobotrya  – 1 sp.
 Endobotryella  – 1 sp.
 Endocolium  – 1 sp.
 Endoconospora  – 2 spp.
 Endocoryneum  – 3 spp.
 Endogenospora  – 1 sp.
 Endomelanconium  – 4 spp.
 Endophragmiella  – ca. 80 spp.*
 Endophragmiopsis  – 2 spp.
 Endoplacodium  – 1 sp.
 Endoramularia  – 1 sp.
 Endosporoideus  – 1 sp.
 Endozythia  – 1 sp.
 Enerthidium  – 1 sp.
 Engelhardtiella  – 1 sp.
 Enridescalsia  – 1 sp.
 Enthallopycnidium  – 1 sp.
 Entoderma  – 1 sp.
 Epaphroconidia  – 1 sp.
 Ephelidium  – 1 sp.
 Epiclinium  – 2 spp.
 Epicoccospora  – 2 spp.
 Episporogoniella  – 1 sp.
 Epistigme  – 2 spp.
 Epithyrium  – 2 spp.
 Eriocercospora  – 3 spp.
 Eriospora  – 1 sp.
 Erispora  – 1 sp.
 Esteya  – 1 sp.
 Evanidomus  – 1 sp.
 Everhartia  – 6 spp.
 Everniicola  – 1 sp.
 Eversia  – 2 spp.
 Excipularia  – 2 spp.
 Exophoma  – 1 sp.
 Exosporella  – 1 sp.
 Exosporodiella  – 1 sp.

Top of page

F

 Fairmaniella  – 1 sp.
 Farriolla  – 1 sp.
 Favostroma  – 1 sp.
 Feltgeniomyces  – 4 spp.
 Fenestroconidia  – 1 sp.
 Fissuricella  – 1 sp.
 Flabellocladia  – 2 spp.
 Flabellospora  – 6 spp.
 Flosculomyces  – 2 spp.
 Frigidispora  – 1 sp.
 Fujimyces  – 2 spp.
 Fuligomyces  – 4 spp.
 Fumagopsis  – 2 spp.
 Furcaspora  – 2 spp.
 Fusamen  – 2 spp.
 Fuscophialis  – 4 spp.
 Fusticeps  – 5 spp.

Top of page

G

 Gaeumanniella  – 1 sp.
 Gallaicolichen  – 1 sp.
 Gampsonema  – 1 sp.
 Gangliophora  – 1 sp.
 Gangliostilbe  – 5 spp.
 Garnaudia  – 3 spp.
 Gaubaea  – 2 spp.
 Gelatinocrinis  – 1 sp.
 Gelatinopycnis  – 1 sp.
 Geminoarcus  – 3 spp.
 Gemmulina  – 1 sp.
 Geohypha  – 1 sp.*
 Gilmaniella  – 9 spp.
 Glaphyriopsis  – 2 spp.
 Glioannellodochium  – 1 sp.
 Glioblastocladium  – 1 sp.
 Globoconidiopsis  – 1 sp.
 Globoconidium  – 1 sp.
 Gloeocoryneum  – 3 spp.
 Gloeodes  – 1 sp.
 Gloeosporiella  – 1 sp.
 Gloiosphaera  – 2 spp.
 Glutinium  – 2 spp.
 Goidanichiella  – 5 spp.
 Gonatobotryum  – 4 spp.
 Goniopila  – 1 sp.
 Goosiella  – 1 sp.
 Goosiomyces  – 2 spp.
 Grallomyces  – 1 sp.
 Graphiothecium  – 6 spp.
 Groveolopsis  – 6 spp.
 Guarroa  – 1 sp.
 Guedea  – 3 spp.
 Guelichia  – 6 spp.
 Gymnoxyphium  – 6 spp.
 Gyrophthorus  – 3 spp.

Top of page

H

 Hadronema  – 4 spp.
 Hadrosporium  – 2 spp.
 Halysiomyces  – 1 sp.
 Hansfordiopeltis  – 5 spp.
 Hansfordiopeltopsis  – 1 sp.
 Hapalosphaeria  – 1 sp.
 Haplariopsis  – 2 spp.
 Haplobasidion  – 3 spp.
 Haplolepis  – 3 spp.
 Haptocara  – 1 sp.
 Harmoniella  – 2 spp.
 Harpographium  – 5 spp.
 Harpostroma  – 1 sp.
 Heimiodora  – 1 sp.
 Helensiella  – 1 sp.
 Helhonia  – 1 sp.
 Helicofilia  – 2 spp.
 Helicogoosia  – 1 sp.
 Helicominopsis  – 2 spp.
 Helicorhoidion  – 6 spp.
 Helicosingula  – 1 sp.
 Helicothyrium  – 1 sp.
 Helicoubisia  – 1 sp.
 Heliscella  – 2 spp.
 Heliscina  – 2 spp.
 Helminthosporiomyces  – 1 sp.
 Helochora  – 1 sp.
 Hemicorynesporella  – 1 sp.
 Hemidothis  – 1 sp.
 Hemisphaeropsis  – 1 sp.
 Hendersoniella  – 1 sp.
 Hendersonina  – 1 sp.
 Hendersoniopsis  – 1 sp.
 Hendersonula  – 20 spp.
 Hendersonulina  – 1 sp.
 Henfellra  – 1 sp.
 Henicospora  – 6 spp.
 Herposira  – 1 sp.
 Herreromyces  – 1 sp.
 Heterocephalum  – 2 spp.
 Heterosporiopsis  – 1 sp.
 Heuflera  – 1 sp.
 Hexacladium  – 1 sp.
 Himantia  – 4 spp.
 Hinoa  – 2 spp.
 Hirudinaria   – 2 spp.
 Hobsoniopsis  – 1 sp.
 Hoehneliella  – 2 spp.
 Holubovaea  – 2 spp.
 Homalopeltis  – 1 sp.
 Hoornsmania  – 1 sp.
 Hormiactis  – 5 spp.
 Hormiscioideus  – 1 sp.
 Hormocephalum  – 1 sp.
 Hormographis  – 1 sp.
 Hughesinia  – 3 spp.
 Hyalobelemnospora  – 1 sp.
 Hyalocamposporium  – 4 spp.
 Hyalocephalotrichum  – 1 sp.
 Hyalocladium  – 1 sp.
 Hyalocylindrophora  – 3 spp.
 Hyalodermella  – 1 sp.
 Hyalodictyum  – 1 sp.
 Hyalohelicomina  – 1 sp.
 Hyalopleiochaeta  – 1 sp.
 Hyalopyrenia  – 1 sp.
 Hyalosynnema  – 1 sp.
 Hyalothyridium  – 1 sp.
 Hydrometrospora  – 1 sp.
 Hymenella  – 11 spp.
 Hymeniopeltis  – 3 spp.
 Hymenobactron  – 1 sp.
 Hymenobia  – 1 sp.
 Hymenopsis  – 13 spp.
 Hyphodiscosia  – 5 spp.
 Hyphodiscosioides  – 1 sp.
 Hyphopolynema  – 6 spp.
 Hyphostereum  – 1 sp.
 Hyphothyrium  – 1 sp.
 Hyphozyma  – 4 spp.
 Hypnotheca  – 1 sp.
 Hypocline  – 1 sp.
 Hypodermina  – 1 sp.
 Hypogloeum  – 1 sp.
 Hypotrachynicola  – 1 sp.
 Hysteridium  – 1 sp.
 Hysterodiscula  – 1 sp.
 Hysteropycnis  – 1 sp.

Top of page

I

 Ialomitzia  – 1 sp.
 Idiocercus  – 2 spp.
 Igneocumulus  – 10 spp.
 Imicles  – 6 spp.
 Impudentia  – 1 sp.
 Inesiosporium  – 2 spp.
 Inifatiella  – 1 sp.
 Intercalarispora  – 1 sp.
 Intralichen  – 4 spp.
 Ionophragmium  – 1 sp.
 Irpicomyces  – 3 spp.
 Ischnostroma  – 1 sp.
 Isthmoconidium  – 1 sp.
 Isthmolongispora  – 11 spp.
 Isthmophragmospora  – 2 spp.
 Isthmotricladia  – 3 spp.
 Ityorhoptrum  – 4 spp.
 Iyengarina  – 3 spp.

Top of page

J

 Javonarxia  – 2 spp.
 Jayarambhatia  – 1 sp.
 Jerainum  – 1 sp.
 Jubispora  – 1 sp.
 Junctospora  – 1 sp.

Top of page

K

 Kalamarospora  – 1 sp.
 Kalchbrenneriella  – 1 sp.
 Kaleidosporium  – 1 sp.
 Kamatella  – 1 sp.
 Kamatia  – 1 sp.
 Kameshwaromyces  – 2 spp.
 Katherinomyces  – 1 sp.
 Keissleriomyces  – 1 sp.
 Kendrickiella  – 1 sp.
 Ketubakia  – 1 sp.
 Kiliophora  – 3 spp.
 Kionocephala  – 1 sp.
 Kmetia  – 1 sp.
 Kmetiopsis  – 1 sp.
 Knemiothyrium  – 1 sp.
 Kodonospora  – 1 sp.
 Kolletes  – 1 sp.
 Kontospora  – 1 sp.
 Korunomyces  – 3 spp.
 Kostermansinda  – 4 spp.
 Kostermansindiopsis  – 1 sp.
 Kramabeeja  – 1 sp.
 Kramasamuha  – 1 sp.
 Kreiseliella  – 1 sp.
 Kumanasamuha  – 5 spp.
 Kutilakesa  – 2 spp.
 Kyphophora  – 1 sp.

Top of page

L

 Lacellina  – 3 spp.
 Lacellinopsis  – 3 spp.
 Laciniocladium  – 1 sp.
 Lagenomyces  – 1 sp.
 Lambdasporium  – 3 spp.
 Lambinonia  – 1 sp.
 Laocoon  – 1 sp.
 Lappodochium  – 1 sp.
 Lasiodiplodiella  – 3 spp.
 Lasiothyrium  – 1 sp.
 Lasmeniella  – 13 spp.
 Latericonis  – 1 sp.
 Lateriramulosa  – 5 spp.
 Laterispora  – 1 sp.
 Lawalreea  – 1 sp.
 Lecaniocola  – 1 sp.
 Leeina  – 1 sp.
 Leightoniomyces  – 2 spp.
 Lembuncula  – 1 sp.
 Lemkea  – 1 sp.
 Lepisticola  – 1 sp.
 Leprieurinella  – 1 sp.
 Leptascospora  – 1 sp.
 Leptochlamys  – 1 sp.
 Leptodermella  – 1 sp.
 Leptophyllosticta  – 2 spp.
 Leptostromella  – 2 spp.
 Leptothyrella  – 10 spp.
 Leptothyrina  – 1 sp.
 Leptothyrium  – 2 spp.
 Leucoconiella  – 1 sp.
 Leucoconis  – 1 sp.
 Leucodochium  – 1 sp.
 Leuliisinea  – 2 spp.
 Lichenobactridium  – 1 sp.
 Lichenohendersonia  – 4 spp.
 Lichenopeziza  – 1 sp.
 Lichenophoma  – 2 spp.
 Lichenopuccinia  – 1 sp.
 Lichenostella  – 1 sp.
 Linkosia  – 12 spp.
 Linochorella  – 1 sp.
 Linodochium  – 5)
 Listeromyces  – 1 sp.
 Lithopythium  – 3 spp.
 Lobatopedis  – 5 spp.
 Loliomyces  – 1 sp.
 Lomaantha  – 3 spp.
 Lomachashaka  – 5 spp.
 Ludwigomyces  – 1 sp.
 Luxuriomyces  – 1 sp.
 Luzfridiella  – 1 sp.
 Lylea  – 6 spp.
 Lysotheca  – 6 spp.

Top of page

M

 Mackenziella  – 1 sp.
 Macroallantina  – 1 sp.
 Macrodiplodia  – 2 spp.
 Macrotrichum  – 2 spp.
 Magmopsis  – 1 sp.
 Mahabalella  – 4 spp.
 Manginella  – 2 spp.
 Mapletonia  – 1 sp.
 Margarinomyces  – 1 sp.
 Martinellisia  – 1 sp.
 Massalongina  – 2 spp.
 Massariothea  - 10 spp.
 Matsushimiella  – 2 spp.
 Matsushimomyces  – 2 spp.
 Medusamyces  – 1 sp.
 Megalodochium  – 4 spp.
 Melanocephala  – 5 spp.
 Melanophoma  – 1 sp.
 Melophia  – 4 spp.
 Menidochium  – 1 sp.
 Mercadomyces  – 1 sp.
 Merismella  – 6 spp.
 Mesocorynespora  – 1 sp.*
 Metadiplodia  – 40 spp.
 Metazythia  – 1 sp.
 Metazythiopsis  – 1 sp.
 Microblastosporon  – 1 sp.
 Microclava  – 5 spp.
 Microdiscula  – 2 spp.
 Microdothiorella  – 1 sp.
 Microhendersonula  – 1 sp.
 Micromastia  – 2 spp.
 Microperella  – 1 sp.
 Micropustulomyces  – 1 sp.
 Microtyle  – 1 sp.
 Microxyphiella  – 15 spp.
 Microxyphiopsis  – 2 spp.
 Mindoa  – 2 spp.
 Minimidochium  – 8 spp.
 Minteriella  – 1 sp.
 Minutophoma  – 1 sp.
 Mirandina  – ca. 10 spp.
 Miricatena  – 2 spp.
 Mirimyces  – 1 sp.
 Monochaetiella  – 3 spp.
 Monochaetinula  – 6 spp.
 Monochaetopsis  – 1 sp.
 Monodia  – 2 spp.
 Monodidymaria  – 5 spp.
 Monodisma  – 1 sp.
 Monostichella  – 15 spp.
 Moorella  – 3 spp.
 Moralesia  – 1 sp.
 Morrisographium  – 8 spp.
 Mucosetospora  – 1 sp.
 Muiogone  – 2 spp.
 Muirella  – 1 sp.
 Murogenella  – 3 spp.
 Mycelephas  – 2 spp.
 Mycocentrodochium  – 1 sp.
 Mycoenterolobium  – 3 spp.
 Mycohypallage  – 2 spp.
 Mycopara  – 1 sp.
 Mycospraguea  – 1 sp.
 Mycosticta  – 1 sp.
 Mycosylva  – 3 spp.
 Mycotodea  – 14 spp.
 Mycousteria  – 2 spp.
 Myiocoprula  – 2 spp.
 Myriellina  – 2 spp.
 Myrmecomyces  – 1 sp.
 Myrotheciastrum  – 1 sp.
 Mystrosporiella  – 4 spp.
 Myxoparaphysella  – 2 spp.
 Myxosporella  – 1 sp.
 Myxosporidiella  – 1 sp.
 Myxostomellina  – 1 sp.
 Myxothyriopsis  – 1 sp.
 Myxothyrium  – 1 sp.

Top of page

N

 Naemosphaera  – 1 sp.
 Naemosphaerella  – 2 spp.
 Nagrajia  – 1 sp.
 Nagrajomyces  – 1 sp.
 Nakatopsis  – 2 spp.
 Nanoschema  – 1 sp.
 Naothyrsium  – 1 sp.
 Necraphidium  – 1 sp.
 Negeriella  – 3 sp. 
 Nematogonum  – 1 sp.
 Nematographium  – 5 spp.
 Nemozythiella  – 1 sp.
 Neoalpakesa  – 1 sp.
 Neoarbuscula  – 1 sp.
 Neobarclaya  – 2 spp.
 Neodiplodina  – 1 sp.
 Neofuckelia  – 1 sp.
 Neoheteroceras  – 2 spp.
 Neojohnstonia  – 2 spp.
 Neoligniella  – 4 spp.
 Neomarssoniella  – 1 sp.
 Neomelanconium  – 3 spp.
 Neopeltis  – 3 spp.
 Neopericonia  – 1 sp.
 Neophoma  – 2 spp.
 Neoplaconema  – 2 spp.
 Neopodoconis  – 3 spp.
 Neospegazzinia  – 2 spp.
 Neottiospora  – 2 spp.
 Neozythia  – 1 sp.
 Neta  – 10 spp.
 Nidulispora  – 1 sp.
 Nigrolentilocus  – 6 spp.
 Nigromacula  – 1 sp.
 Nigropuncta  – 2 spp.
 Nosophloea  – 3 spp.
 Nothospora  – 1 sp.
 Novozymia  – 1 sp.
 Nummospora  – 1 sp.
 Nusia  – 2 spp.
 Nyctalospora  – 1 sp.
 Nypaella  – 2 spp.

Top of page

O

 Obeliospora  – 5 spp.
 bstipipilus  – 1 sp.
 Octopodotus  – 1 sp.
 Odontodictyospora  – 1 sp.
 Ojibwaya  – 1 sp.
 Omega  – 1 sp.
 Oncopodium  – 12 spp.
 Oncospora  – 8 spp.
 Oncosporella  – 1 sp.
 Oncostroma  – 1 sp.
 Onychophora  – 1 sp.
 Oothyrium  – 1 sp.
 Ophiosira  – 1 sp.
 Orphanocoela  – 3 spp.
 Ostracoderma  – 3 spp.
 Ostracodermidium  – 1 sp.
 Oswaldina  – 1 sp.

Top of page

P

 Paathramaya  – 5 spp.
 Pachycladina  – 3 spp.
 Palawaniopsis  – 1 sp.
 Papilionospora  – 1 sp.
 Pappimyces  – 1 sp.
 Paraaoria  – 1 sp.
 Paraarthrocladium  – 1 sp.
 Parablastocatena  – 1 sp.
 Paraceratocladium  – 6 spp.
 Parachionomyces  – 1 sp.
 Paracostantinella  – 1 sp.
 Paracryptophiale  – 2 spp.
 Paracytospora  – 1 sp.
 Paradendryphiopsis  – 5 spp.
 Paradidymobotryum  – 1 sp.
 Paradiplodia  – 6 spp.
 Paradischloridium  – 1 sp.
 Paradiscula  – 1 sp.
 Parafulvia  – 1 sp.
 Parahaplotrichum  – 1 sp.
 Paraharknessia  – 1 sp.
 Parahyalotiopsis  – 1 sp.
 Paramassariothea  – 1 sp.
 Paramenisporopsis  – 1 sp.
 Parapericonia  – 2 spp.
 Parapericoniella  – 1 sp.
 Paraphaeoisaria  – 1 sp.
 Parapithomyces  – 1 sp.
 Parapyricularia  – 4 spp.
 Pararobillarda  – 1 sp.
 Parasphaeropsis  – 1 sp.
 Parastigmatellina  – 1 sp.
 Paratetraploa  – 1 sp.
 Paratomenticola  – 2 spp.
 Paratrichoconis  – 4 spp.
 Paraulocladium  – 2 spp.
 Paspalomyces  – 1 sp.
 Patriciomyces  – 1 sp.
 Pazschkeella  – 2 spp.
 Peethasthabeeja  – 1 sp.
 Pellionella  – 1 sp.
 Peltasterinostroma  – 1 sp.
 Peltasteropsis  – 7 spp.
 Peltistroma  – 1 sp.
 Peltistromella  – 1 sp.
 Peltosoma  – 1 sp.
 Peltostromellina  – 1 sp.
 Peltostromopsis  – 1 sp.
 Penzigomyces  – 13 spp.
 Perelegamyces  – 1 sp.
 Perizomella  – 1 sp.
 Pestalozziella  – 4 spp.
 Petrakiopsis  – 1 sp.
 Phacostroma  – 1 sp.
 Phacostromella  – 1 sp.
 Phaeoblastophora  – 2 spp.
 Phaeocandelabrum  – 3 spp.
 Phaeodactylium  – 7 spp.
 Phaeodiscula  – 1 sp.
 Phaeodomus  – 3 spp.
 Phaeohiratsukaea  – 1 sp.
 Phaeoidiomyces  – 2 spp.
 Phaeolabrella  – 1 sp.
 Phaeomonilia  – 5 spp.
 Phaeomonostichella  – 1 sp.
 Phaeophomopsis  – 1 sp.
 Phaeoschizotrichum  – 1 sp.
 Phaeostalagmus  – 7 spp.
 Phaeostilbelloides  – 1 sp.
 Phaeothyrium  – 1 sp.
 Phaeotrichoconis  – 8 spp.
 Phellostroma  – 1 sp.
 Phialoarthrobotryum  – 2 spp.
 Phialogeniculata  – 4 spp.
 Phialophaeoisaria  – 1 sp.
 Phialostele  – 1 sp.
 Phialotubus  – 1 sp.
 Phloeosporina  – 1 sp.
 Phomachora  – 2 spp.
 Phomachorella  – 1 sp.
 Phomatosporella  – 1 sp.
 Phomyces  – 1 sp.
 Phragmoconidium  – 1 sp.
 Phragmopeltis  – 5 spp.
 Phragmospathula  – 3 spp.
 Phragmospathulella  – 1 sp.
 Phthora  – 1 sp.
 Phylloedium  – 1 sp.
 Phyllohendersonia  – 25 spp.
 Physalidiella  – 2 spp.
 Physalidiopsis  – 1 sp.
 Piggotia  – 3 spp.
 Pinatubo  – 1 sp.
 Piperivora  – 1 sp.
 Piricaudilium  – 2 spp.
 Piricaudiopsis  – 1 sp.
 Pirispora  – 1 sp.
 Pirostomella  – 2 spp.
 Pithosira  – 1 sp.
 Pittostroma  – 1 sp.
 Placella  – 1 sp.
 Placodiplodia  – 2 spp.
 Placonema  – 3 spp.
 Placonemina  – 1 sp.
 Placosphaerina  – 1 sp.
 Placothea  – 1 sp.
 Placothyrium  – 1 sp.
 Plasia  – 1 sp.
 Plectonaemella  – 1 sp.
 Plectopeltis  – 1 sp.
 Plectophomopsis  – 1 sp.
 Plectopycnis  – 4 spp.
 Plectosira  – 1 sp.
 Plectronidiopsis  – 1 sp.
 Plectronidium  – 4 spp.
 Plenocatenulis  – 1 sp.
 Plenophysa  – 1 sp.
 Plenotrichopsis  – 1 sp.
 Plenotrichum  – 2 spp.
 Plenozythia  – 2 spp.
 Pleocouturea  – 2 spp.
 Plesiospora  – 1 sp.
 Pleurodesmospora  – 1 sp.
 Pleurodiscula  – 1 sp.
 Pleurodomus  – 1 sp.
 Pleuropedium  – 3 spp.
 Pleurophomopsis  – 7 spp.
 Pleuroplaconema  – 2 spp.
 Pleuroplacosphaeria  – 1 sp.
 Pleurotheciopsis  – 6 spp.
 Pleurothyriella  – 1 sp.
 Pocillopycnis  – 1 sp.
 Podoplaconema  – 1 sp.
 Podosporiella  – 4 spp.
 Podosporiopsis  – 2 spp.
 Podosporium  – 67 spp.
 Poikilosperma  – 1 sp.
 Polybulbophiale  – 1 sp.
 Polychaetella  – 3 spp.
 Polycladium  – 1 sp.
 Polydesmus  – 14 spp.
 Polyetron  – 1 sp.
 Polylobatispora  – 3 spp.
 Polyrostrata  – 2 spp.
 Polystomellomyces  – 1 sp.
 Polystratorictus  – 2 spp.
 Polytretophora  – 3 spp.
 Porocladium  – 1 sp.
 Poroisariopsis  – 1 sp.*
 Poropeltis  – 1 sp.
 Porophilomyces  – 1 sp.
 Porosubramaniania  – 2 spp.
 Porrectotheca  – 1 sp.
 Potamomyces  – 1 sp.
 Powellia  – 1 sp.
 Proboscispora  – 1 sp. 
 Protostegiomyces  – 1 sp.
 Protostroma  – 1 sp.
 Pseudoacrodictys  – 14 spp.
 Pseudoanguillospora  – 3 spp.
 Pseudoaristastoma  – 1 sp.
 Pseudoasperisporium  – 3 spp.
 Pseudobasidiospora  – 1 sp.
 Pseudocanalisporium  – 1 sp.
 Pseudocenangium  – 1 sp.
 Pseudochuppia  – 1 sp.
 Pseudoclathrosphaerina  – 2 spp.
 Pseudoconium  – 1 sp.
 Pseudocytoplacosphaeria  – 1 sp.
 Pseudocytospora  – 1 sp.
 Pseudodichomera  – 3 spp.
 Pseudodiplodia  – 45 spp.
 Pseudodiscula  – 2 spp.
 Pseudofuscophialis  – 1 sp.
 Pseudogaster  – 1 sp.
 Pseudographiella  – 3 spp.
 Pseudohepatica  – 1 sp.
 Pseudomicrodochium  – 8 spp.
 Pseudoneottiospora  – 2 spp.
 Pseudopatellina  – 1 sp.
 Pseudopeltistroma  – 1 sp.
 Pseudoperitheca  – 1 sp.
 Pseudopetrakia  – 2 spp.
 Pseudophloeosporella  – 1 sp.
 Pseudophragmotrichum  – 1 sp.
 Pseudopolystigmina  – 2 spp.
 Pseudoramularia  – 2 spp.
 Pseudorhizopogon  – 1 sp.
 Pseudoschizothyra  – 1 sp.
 Pseudosigmoidea  – 2 spp.
 Pseudostegia  – 1 sp.
 Pseudothyrium  – 1 sp.
 Pseudotorula  – 3 spp.
 Pseudotracylla  – 2 spp.
 Pseudotrichoconis  – 1 sp.
 Pseudozythia  – 1 sp.
 Psilosphaeria  – 1 sp.
 Pteromycula  – 1 sp.
 Pterulopsis  – 1 sp.
 Pterygosporopsis  – 2 spp.
 Pucciniospora  – 1 sp.
 Pulchromyces  – 1 sp.
 Pullospora  – 2 spp.
 Pulvinella  – 1 sp.
 Punctillina  – 1 sp.
 Pycmaeosphaera  – 3 spp.
 Pycnidioarxiella  – 1 sp.
 Pycnidiopeltis  – 1 sp.
 Pycnis  – 1 sp.
 Pycnodactylus  – 1 sp.
 Pycnodallia  – 1 sp.
 Pycnoharknessia  – 1 sp.
 Pycnomma  – 1 sp.
 Pycnomoreletia  – 2 spp.
 Pycnoseynesia  – 1 sp.
 Pycnothera  – 1 sp.
 Pycnothyriella  – 2 spp.
 Pycnothyrium  – 6 spp.
 Pyramidospora  – 9 spp.
 Pyrenyllium  – 2 spp.
 Pyrgostroma  – 2 spp.
 Pyripnomyces  – 1 sp.

Top of page

Q

 Quadracaea  – 3 spp.
 Quadricladium  – 1 sp.
 Quasidiscus  – 1 sp.
 Queenslandia  – 5 spp.
 Quezelia  – 1 sp.

Top of page

R

 Raciborskiomyces  – 4 spp.
 Radiatispora  – 1 sp.
 Raizadenia  – 1 sp.
 Ramakrishnanella  – 1 sp.
 Ramicapitulum  – 1 sp.
 Ramicephala  – 1 sp.
 Ramiphialis  – 1 sp.*
 Ramoconidiifera  – 2 spp.
 Ranojevicia  – 1 sp.
 Redbia  – 5 spp.
 Refractohilum  – 5 spp.
 Repetoblastiella  – 1 sp.
 Rhabdoclema  – 2 spp.
 Rhabdogloeopsis  – 2 spp.
 Rhabdostromella  – 1 sp.
 Rhabdostromina  – 3 spp.
 Rhexoampullifera  – 3 spp.
 Rhexoprolifer  – 1 sp.
 Rhinotrichella  – 4 spp.
 Rhipidocephalum  – 2 spp.
 Rhizosphaerina  – 2 spp.
 Rhodesia  – 2 spp.
 Rhodesiopsis  – 2 spp.
 Rhodothallus  – 2 spp.
 Rhombostilbella  – 2 spp.
 Rhopalocladium  – 1 sp.
 Rhynchodiplodia  – 1 sp.
 Rhynchomyces  – 1 sp.
 Rhynchoseptoria  – 1 sp.
 Rhynchosporina  – 2 spp.
 Riclaretia  – 1 sp.
 Rileya  – 1 sp.
 Robakia  – 1 sp.
 Roeslerina  – 3 spp.
 Rogergoosiella  – 1 sp.
 Roigiella  – 1 sp.
 Roscoepoundia  – 1 sp.
 Rosulomyces  – 1 sp.
 Rota  – 1 sp.
 Ruggieria  – 1 sp.

Top of page

S

Saania  – 1 sp.
Sadasivania  – 3 spp.
Sanjuanomyces  – 1 sp.
Sarcinosporon  – 1 sp.
Sarcoexcipula  – 1 sp.
Sarcophoma  – 3 spp.
Sarophorum  – 1 sp.
Satchmopsis  – 1 sp.
Sativumoides  – 1 sp.
Scaphidium  – 1 sp.
Sceptrifera  – 1 sp.
Schizothyra  – 1 sp.
Schizothyrella  – 1 sp.
Schizothyropsis  – 1 sp.
Schizotrichum  – 1 sp.
Schroeteria  – 1 sp.
Schwarzmannia  – 1 sp.
Scirrhophoma  – 1 sp.
Sclerographiopsis  – 1 sp.
Sclerographium  – 4 spp.
Scleromeris  – 3 spp.
Sclerophoma  – 30 spp.
Scleropycnis  – 2)
Sclerozythia  – 1 sp.
Scolecobasidiella  – 2)
Scolecobeltrania  – 1 sp.
Scolecodochium  – 1 sp.
Scolecosporiella  – 6 spp.
Scolecotheca  – 1 sp.
Scolecozythia  – 1 sp.
Scoliotidium  – 1 sp.
Scopaphoma  – 1 sp.
Scopulariella  – 1 sp.
Scothelius  – 1 sp.
Scutisporus  – 1 sp.
Scutopeltis  – 2 spp.
Scutopycnis  – 2 spp.
Seifertia  – 3 spp.
Seimatosporiopsis  – 2 spp.
Selenosira  – 1 sp.
Selenosporopsis  – 1 sp.
Septocytella  – 1 sp.
Septogloeum  – 2 spp.
Septomyxella  – 1 sp.
Septosporiopsis  – 1 sp.
Septosporium  – 5 spp.
Septotrullula  – 2 spp.
Sessiliospora  – 1 sp.
Setolibertella  – 1 sp.
Setophiale  – 1 sp.
Setosporella  – 1 sp.
Seychellomyces  – 1 sp.
Seynesiopsis  – 1 sp.
Shawiella  – 1 sp.
Sheariella  – 1 sp.
Sheathnema  – 2 spp.
Shivomyces  – 2 spp.
Siamia  – 1 sp.
Sigmatomyces  – 1 sp.
Similitrichoconis  – 1 sp.*
Simmonsiella  – 1 sp.
Sirexcipula  – 1 sp.
Sirocyphis  – 1 sp.
Sirogloea  – 1 sp.
Siroligniella  – 1 sp.
Sirophoma  – 3 spp.
Siroplacodium  – 6 spp.
Siropleura  – 1 sp.
Siroscyphellina  – 2 spp.
Sirosperma  – 2 spp.
Sirosphaera  – 2 spp.
Sirosporonaemella  – 1 sp.
Sirothecium  – 3 spp.
Sirothyriella  – 2 spp.
Sirothyrium  – 1 sp.
Sirozythia  – 2 spp.
Sirozythiella  – 1 sp.
Sitochora  – 1 sp.
Slimacomyces  – 2 spp.
Solheimia  – 2 spp.
Soloacrospora  – 2 spp.
Solosympodiella  – 8 spp.
Soloterminospora  – 1 sp.
Spermatoloncha  – 1 sp.
Spermochaetella  – 1 sp.
Spermospora  – 9 spp.
Spermosporella  – 4 spp.
Sphaeridium  – 5 spp.
Sphaeriostromella  – 1 sp.
Sphaeriothyrium  – 2 spp.
Sphaeromma  – 2 spp.
Sphaeronaema  – 50 spp.
Sphaerophoma  – 2 spp.
Sphaerulomyces  – 1 sp.
Spinulospora  – 1 sp.
Spiralum  – 2 spp.
Spiropes  – ca. 40 spp.
Splanchospora  – 1 sp.
Spondylocladiella  – 2 spp.
Spondylocladiopsis  – 2 spp.
Sporhaplus  – 1 sp.
Sporidesmiopsis  – 6 spp.
Sporoglena  – 1 sp.
Sporophiala  – 3 spp.
Sporotretophora  – 1 sp.
Stachybotryella  – 3 spp.
Stachybotryna  – 6 spp.
Stagonopatella  – 1 sp.
Stagonopsis  – 4 spp.
Stagonosporina  – 1 sp.
Stagonostromella  – 1 sp.
Staheliella  – 2 spp.
Stalagmochaetia  – 2 spp.
Stanhughesiella  – 1 sp.
Stauronema  – 5 spp.
Stauronematopsis  – 1 sp.
Staurophoma  – 1 sp.
Stegonsporiopsis  – 1 sp.
Stellifraga  – 1 sp.
Stellomyces  – 2 spp.
Stellopeltis  – 2 spp.
Stellospora  – 2 spp.
Stellothyriella  – 2 spp.
Stenocephalopsis  – 1 sp.
Stenocladiella  – 1 sp.
Stenospora  – 1 sp.
Stephembruneria  – 1 sp.
Stevensomyces  – 1 sp.
Stevensonula  – 1 sp. 
Stictopatella  – 1 sp.
Stigmatellina  – 1 sp.
Stigmea  – 1 sp.
Stigmella  – 28 spp.
Stigmopeltis  – 2 spp.
Stilbellula  – 1 sp.
Stilbodendron  – 1 sp.
Stilbophoma  – 1 sp.
Strasseriopsis  – 1 sp.
Stratiphoromyces  – 2 spp.
Striosphaeropsis  – 1 sp.
Stromatocrea  – 1 sp.
Stromatopogon  – 3 spp.
Stromatopycnis  – 1 sp.
Stromatostysanus  – 3 spp.
Strongylothallus  – 1 sp.
Stygiomyces  – 1 sp.
Stylaspergillus  – 1 sp.
Subhysteropycnis  – 1 sp.
Subicularium  – 1 sp.
Subulispora  – 8 spp.
Suttoniella  – 4 spp.
Suttonina  – 1 sp.
Syamithabeeja  – 1 sp.
Sylviacollaea  – 1 sp.
Symphysos  – 1 sp.
Sympodiocladium  – 1 sp.
Sympodioclathra  – 1 sp.
Sympodioplanus  – 3 spp.
Sympodiosynnema  – 1 sp.
Synchronoblastia  – 1 sp.
Syncladium  – 1 sp.
Synnemacrodictys  – 1 sp.
Synnemaseimatoides  – 1 sp.
Synnematomyces  – 1 sp.
Synostomina  – 1 sp.
Syphosphaera  – 1 sp.
Systremmopsis  – 1 sp.

Top of page

T

 Taeniolina  – 6 spp.
Talekpea  – 1 sp.
Talpapellis  – 5 spp.
Tandonea  – 1 sp.
Tarsodisporus  – 1 sp.
Tectacervulus  – 1 sp.
Telioclipeum  – 1 sp.
Temerariomyces  – 1 sp.
Teratosperma  – 11 spp.
Teratospermopsis  – 1 sp.*
Termitaria  – 6 spp.
Tetrabrachium  – 1 sp.
Tetrabrunneospora  – 1 sp.
Tetracoccosporium  – 4 spp.
Tetranacriella  – 1 sp.
Tetranacrium  – 1 sp.
Tetraposporium  – 2 spp.
Textotheca  – 1 sp.
Thaptospora  – 3 spp.
Thirumalacharia  – 1 sp.
Tholomyces  – 1 sp.
Thoracella  – 1 sp.
Thrinacospora  – 1 sp.
Thyriostromella  – 1 sp.
Thyrostromella  – 3 spp.
Thyrsidiella  – 2 spp.
Thyrsidina  – 1 sp.
Tiarosporellivora  – 1 sp.
Ticogloea  – 2 spp.
Ticosynnema  – 1 sp.
Titaea  – 23 spp.
Titaeopsis  – 1 sp.
Titaeospora  – 2 spp.
Tomenticola  – 1 sp.
Tompetchia  – 1 sp.
Toxosporiella  – 1 sp.
Toxosporiopsis  – 1 sp.
Toxosporium  – 2 spp.
Tracylla  – 3 spp.
Trematophoma  – 2 spp.
Tremellidium  – 1 sp.
Tretendophragmia  – 1 sp.
Tretocephala  – 1 sp.
Tretolylea  – 1 sp.
Tretospeira  – 1 sp.
Tretovularia  – 1 sp.
Tribolospora  – 1 sp.
Tricellula  – 8 spp.
Trichobolbus  – 1 sp.
Trichobotrys  – 4 spp.
Trichoconis  – 21 spp.
Trichodiscula  – 1 sp.
Trichodochium  – 3 spp.
Trichomatoclava  – 1 sp.
Trichomatomyces  – 1 sp.
Trichomatosphaera  – 1 sp.
Trichopeltulum  – 1 sp.
Trichoseptoria  – 2 spp.
Trichosporiella  – 4 spp.
Trichosporodochium  – 1 sp.
Trichotheca  – 1 sp.
Tricladiella  – 1 sp.
Tricladiopsis  – 2 spp.
Tricladiospora  – 3 spp.
Tricornispora  – 1 sp.
Trifurcospora  – 2 spp.
Trigonosporium  – 2 spp.
Tripoconidium  – 1 sp.
Triposporina  – 2 spp.
Triramulispora  – 3 spp.
Triscelophorus  – 8 spp.
Triscelosporium  – 1 sp.
Trisulcosporium  – 1 sp.
Tromeropsis  – 1 sp.
Troposporium  – 1 sp.
Troposporopsis  – 2 spp.
Tryblidiopycnis  – 1 sp.
Tryssglobulus  – 1 sp.
Tuberculispora  – 1 sp.
Tulipispora  – 1 sp.*
Tunicago  – 2 spp.
Turturconchata  – 2 spp.
Tympanosporium  – 1 sp.

Top of page

U

 Uberispora  – 4 spp.
 Ubrizsya  – 1 sp.
 Ulocoryphus  – 1 sp.
 Umbellidion  – 1 sp.
 Uniseta  – 1 sp.
 Urohendersonia  – 5 spp.
 Urohendersoniella  – 1 sp.
 Uvarispora  – 1 sp.

Top of page

V

 Vagnia  – 1 sp.
 Vanakripa  – 9 spp.
 Vanbeverwijkia  – 1 sp.
 Vanderystiella  – 1 sp.
 Vanterpoolia  – 1 sp.
 Varioseptispora  – 4 spp.*
 Vasudevella  – 1 sp.
 Velloziomyces  – 1 sp.
 Velutipila  – 1 sp.
 Ventrographium  – 1 sp.
 Venustocephala  – 2 spp.
 Venustosynnema  – 3 spp.
 Veracruzomyces  – 1 sp.
 Veramycella  – 1 sp.
 Veramyces  – 1 sp.
 Verdipulvinus  – 1 sp.
 Veronaella  – 1 sp.
 Veronidia  – 1 sp.
 Verrucariella  – 1 sp.
 Verrucophragmia  – 1 sp.
 Verticicladus  – 3 spp.
 Vesicladiella  – 1 sp.
 Vesiculohyphomyces  – 1 sp.
 Vestigium  – 2 spp.
 Virgariella  – 11 spp.
 Viridiannula  – 1 sp.
 Vittalia  – 1 sp.
 Vizellopsidites  – 1 sp.
 Vouauxiella  – 3 spp.

Top of page

W

 Waihonghopes  – 1 sp.
 Wardinella  – 1 sp.
 Waydora  – 1 sp.
 Websteromyces  – 2 spp.
 Weufia  – 1 sp.
 Wolkia  – 1 sp.

Top of page

X

 Xenidiocercus  – 1 sp.
 Xenochora  – 1 sp.
 Xenodomus  – 1 sp.
 Xenoheteroconium  – 1 sp.
 Xenokylindria  – 2 spp.
 Xenomyxa  – 1 sp.
 Xenopeltis  – 1 sp.
 Xenoplaca  – 1 sp.
 Xenostroma  – 1 sp.
 Xeroconium  – 1 sp.
 Xiphomyces  – 2 spp.
 Xiuguozhangia  – 5 spp.
 Xylochia  – 2 spp.
 Xyloglyphis  – 1 sp.
 Xylohypha  – 6 spp.
 Xylohyphopsis  – 3 spp.

Top of page

Y

 Yalomyces  – 6 spp.
 Yinmingella  – 1 sp.
 Ypsilomyces  – 1 sp.
 Yuccamyces  – 6 spp.
 Yunnania  – 3 spp.

Top of page

Z

 Zakatoshia  – 2 spp.
 Zebrospora  – 1 sp.
 Zelandiocoela  – 1 sp.
 Zelodactylaria  – 1 sp.
 Zelopelta  – 1 sp.
 Zelosatchmopsis  – 1 sp.
 Zernya  - 1 sp.
 Zetesimomyces  – 1 sp.
 Zevadia  - 1 sp.
 Zilingia  – 1 sp.
 Zinzipegasa  – 1 sp.
 Zopheromyces  – 1 sp.
 Zunura  – 1 sp.
 Zythia   – 1 sp.
 Zyxiphora  – 1 sp.

Top of page

See also
 List of Dothideomycetes genera incertae sedis

References

 Genera
Lists of fungi genera (alphabetic)